is a Japanese surname. Notable people with the surname include:

, Japanese wrestler and Olympic champion in freestyle wrestling
, Japanese footballer
, Japanese international cricketer
, Japanese volleyball player 
, Japanese sport shooter
, Japanese racing driver
, Japanese politician of the Democratic Party of Japan
, Japanese molecular biologist 
, Japanese footballer and manager
, Japanese baseball player
, Japanese biophysicist
, Japanese baseball player
, Japanese particle physicist

See also
Yanagida, Ishikawa, village located in Fugeshi District, Ishikawa, Japan
73782 Yanagida (1994 TD15), a main-belt asteroid discovered in 1994

Japanese-language surnames